Très Hanley aka Tres Hanley is an American and British actress and singer.

Early life 
Hanley was born in Jersey City, New Jersey, USA. Her mother is of Italian descent and her father's family is from County Cork, Ireland. Hanley spent much of her childhood holidays traveling with her paternal grandmother to England to visit family and become enamored with London at an early age.

Career 
Hanley, a coloratura soprano, trained as an opera singer and attended the Juilliard School in New York City. A teenage protégé of Leonard Bernstein, she was chosen by him to sing as the principal female soloist in concert at Lincoln Center where he conducted her singing his work "Glitter and Be Gay" from Candide.

In 1993 she played Polly Peachum in a London revival of The Beggar's Opera.  She garnered much publicity for the role as she was the first non-British born actress to play the part since the musical was first performed in 1728.

Hanley went on to call London 'home' and established herself as a respected TV actress, working with some of the best of British talent. Her U.K. credits include, The Spender, As Time Goes By, Casualty, Hale & Pace, and Murder Most Horrid and 'Carol' in season 1 of the BBC's  My Hero2. Other television roles in the US include Tales from the Crypt and The Case-Book of Sherlock Holmes.
Internationally, Hanley was known in Germany and throughout parts of Europe as the Bacardi girl in the mid-1990s, and for a popular comedic worldwide commercial for NCR opposite Toby Jones.
On screen she portrayed Robert Downey, Jr.'s mistress in Richard III, and appeared as Deborah Reynolds in the 1995 film Boca a Boca (English: Mouth to Mouth), opposite Javier Bardem.

In summer 2005, Hanley released her first music CD entitled Très Broadway, a tribute to her early roots in musicals. It was followed by a European dance single (an Opera & Rap duet) "Dance of the Euro Diva". The music was composed by Éric Serra.  The piece was originally written for the film The Fifth Element. The club version was a collaboration with Asian Rap artist BURCH, who was also featured on her subsequent Euro-pop album Euro Diva.  Her third album A Siren's Odyssey (2013) is an autobiographical song cycle. Hanley penned the lyrics to title song which serves as prologue to the album. Many of her close friends contributed to the album, including  The Hockey Theme Canadian composer Dolores Claman and Phantom of the Opera Lyricist Charles Hart

On August 30, 2017 she released "Fade To Black" . It was the first pre-released single from her forth album,  "Shades of Darkness" (full release 2021).  Mostly original compositions by Hanley and her "Siren's Odyssey" collaborator Daniel Moctezuma, the album was inspired by her friend composer and musician Bernardo Bonezzi. The song "Fade to Black" was written as a tribute to Bonezzi.  Hanley and Bonezzi met while she was filming Boca a Boca (English: Mouth to Mouth) and became lifelong friends. Hanley recorded one of Bonezzi's songs for the sound track.

Bonezzi was found dead on August 30, 2012. It is reported that his last Facebook posts to friends was "I'm fading to black". Which is where the title of the song came from.  The music video for "Fade To Black" features Bonezzi's home movies as well as clips from some of his appearances.

Personal life 
A reputation for dating 'bad boys', paramours included actor and Oscar winner Javier Bardem, whom she met while working on Mouth to Mouth (1995) aka Boca a Boca. Others included British TV personality James Hewitt, the former British household cavalry officer, who is most notable for being the longtime lover of Diana, Princess of Wales, American footballer (punter for the N.Y. Giants) Sean Landeta, and The Phantom of the Opera collaborator Charles Hart.  Hart composed the song "I Belong to Myself" which is on her 2013 album A Sirens Odyssey.

Rumored relationships include Hugh Grant, and Prince Albert of Monaco with whom European tabloids photographed her in the mid-1990s sharing an intimate kiss while at a Paris nightclub, though no confirmation of a relationship was ever reported.

She is also known as Très Hanley-Millman since her marriage to New York City architect, theatrical producer, and entrepreneur Paul Millman.

Hanley is very active in animal rescue related issues and is a vegan.

A philanthropist, profits from her musical endeavors are supportive of animal rescue and HIV charities, as well as those for the visually impaired.

Discography

Singles

Albums

Soundtracks

References

External links 
Tres Hanley Online - official website

 Official Facebook fan page

Living people
American people of Irish descent
American people of Italian descent
American emigrants to England
Actresses from Jersey City, New Jersey
English film actresses
English stage actresses
English voice actresses
English television actresses
American film actresses
American stage actresses
American voice actresses
American television actresses
American sopranos
English sopranos
Musicians from Jersey City, New Jersey
Year of birth missing (living people)